Lakshmi Sundaram is an American screenwriter, director, and producer.

Born in Brooklyn, Sundaram studied writing at Columbia University. She also received an MFA in Film from Columbia University's School of the Arts. 

Sundaram's first writing credit was for the NBC musical drama television series Smash, co-writing the episode "Tech" with Jason Grote. She would join the writing staff for Brooklyn Nine-Nine, writing for them from 2013 to 2016, and in 2018, as part of the crew for Master of None, she would receive a nomination for the Writers Guild of America Award for Television: Comedy Series. Several of the television shows she has worked on have won Emmy Awards, Golden Globe Awards, Writers Guild of America Awards, and garnered great critical acclaim. Sundaram wrote the episode "Protect Ya Neck" in season 2 of the Hulu series Wu-Tang: An American Saga. The episode received critical and commercial praise, and remains the show's highest rated episode. 

Lakshmi Sundaram is the namesake and great-granddaughter of Muthulakshmi Reddy, an Indian pioneer of civil rights, the first woman to sit as Vice President on any legislature in the world, and peer of Mahatma Gandhi and Annie Besant. Sundaram's other relatives include the Indian actors Gemini Ganesan and Rekha. 

In 2021, Sundaram's accomplishments were profiled by Vogue India, receiving the cover of the magazine's culture section.

References

External links
Lakshmi Sundaram at the Internet Movie Database

Year of birth missing (living people)
American people of Indian descent
American television writers
Columbia University alumni
People from Brooklyn
Living people